Rashmika Opatha (born 27 January 1997) is a Sri Lankan cricketer. He made his first-class debut for Panadura Sports Club in Tier B of the 2017–18 Premier League Tournament on 15 December 2017.

References

External links
 

1997 births
Living people
Sri Lankan cricketers
Panadura Sports Club cricketers
Cricketers from Colombo